The Helgeland Museum is a group of 18 museums and collections of buildings in 18 municipalities in Helgeland, Norway. The concept of the museum is to distribute the museum's expertise across Helgeland. This allows people with special professional skills to work for all of the museums in this collaboration. The Helgeland Museum has about 49 permanent employees. Its administrative office is on Sjøgata (Sea Street) in Mosjøen.

Divisions
Petter Dass Museum in Alstahaug
Bindal Museum
Velfjord Open Air Museum in Brønnøy
Old Nordvika trading post in Dønna
Grane Open Air Museum
Gammelsagmaro Open Air Museum in Grane
Lensmann's farm in Hattfjelldal
Hemnes Museum
Herøy Open Air Museum
Leirfjord Museum
Grønsvik coastal battery in Lurøy
Nesna Museum
Rana Museum
Sømna Open Air Museum
Træna Museum
Vefsn Museum
Vega Open Air Museum
E-House eider duck museum in Vega
Vevelstad Open Air Museum
Rødøy Museum / Old Falch trading post

References

External links
 Helgeland Museum Homepage
 Visit Helgeland

Museums in Nordland